The Estcourt Station–Pohénégamook Border Crossing connects the villages of Estcourt Station, Maine and Pohénégamook, Quebec on the Canada–US border. The crossing is essentially a single small town divided by an international boundary.  Several of the buildings are bisected by the boundary line.  The US border station is located on the south end of town, where a road with access to other parts of Maine is located.  The Canada border station is in the center of town, where the railroad underpass provides access to other parts of Canada.  On the north end of Estcourt, there is an international pedestrian footbridge that crosses the St. Francis River.

See also
 List of Canada–United States border crossings

References

Canada–United States border crossings
1952 establishments in Maine
1952 establishments in Quebec
Buildings and structures in Aroostook County, Maine
Transportation in Aroostook County, Maine
Témiscouata Regional County Municipality